The knockout stage of the 2017 FIFA Confederations Cup began on 28 June with the semi-final round, and concluded on 2 July 2017 with the final at the Krestovsky Stadium in Saint Petersburg. The top two teams from each group advanced to the knockout stage to compete in a single-elimination style tournament. A third place play-off also took place, and was played between the two losing teams of the semi-finals.

In the knockout stage, if a match was level at the end of normal playing time, extra time was played (two periods of 15 minutes each), where each team was allowed to make a fourth substitution. If still tied after extra time, the match was decided by a penalty shoot-out to determine the winners.

All times Moscow Time (UTC+3).

Qualified teams

Bracket

Semi-finals

Portugal vs Chile

Germany vs Mexico

Third place play-off

Final

Notes

References

External links
 Official site
 Official Documents and Match Documents

2017 FIFA Confederations Cup